Bygdeposten is a Norwegian newspaper established in 1954, published in Vikersund, Norway, and owned by A-pressen. Its first editor was Jørgen Bergo. The newspaper covers the municipalities of Modum, Sigdal, Krødsherad and Øvre Eiker.

References

Newspapers published in Norway
Publications established in 1954
1954 establishments in Norway
Mass media in Buskerud
Modum
Amedia